Roman Hinderer (in Chinese called Te) (21 September 1668 – 24 August 1744) was a German Jesuit missionary in imperial China.

Biography
He was born at Reiningen, near Mülhausen (Mulhouse) in Alsace (in what is now France), and died at Shang-ho, in Jiangnan.

On 6 September 1688 he joined the Society of Jesus and became a member of the German province, whence he went to China in 1707. Here the Kangxi Emperor invited him by personal request to collaborate in the great map and chart work in which the Jesuits, acting under imperial instructions, were then engaged. He laboured with Anne-Marie de Mailla and Jean-Baptiste Régis on the mapping of the provinces of Henan, Jiangnan, Zhejiang and Fujian (cfr. Du Halde, "Description de la Chine", The Hague, 1736, I, pref., xliii; and Richthofen, "China," Berlin, 1877, I, 682).

Hinderer, however, was not only a man of science, but also a missionary who for forty years laboured as an apostle and by his zeal and efficiency achieved substantial results. He was twice placed at the head of the mission as canonical visitor. He is especially remembered for his introduction and ardent fostering among the neophytes of the devotion to the Sacred Heart (cf. Nilles, "De ratione festorum SS. Cordis", 5th ed., I, 323; Letierze, "Etude sur le Sacré Coeur", Paris, 1891, II, 104).

References

Sources
 

1668 births
1744 deaths
17th-century German Jesuits
German Roman Catholic missionaries
Jesuit missionaries in China
German expatriates in China